Six-ton tank may refer to

 Vickers 6-Ton
 M1917 tank,  US-built copy of the French Renault FT light tank of World War One.